Richard Kirby (or Kirkby) may refer to:

 Richard Kirkby (c. 1625–1681), English politician
 Richard Kirby (cricketer) (1861–1947), Australian cricketer
 Richard Kirkby (Royal Navy officer) (c. 1657–1703), Royal Navy captain
 Sir Richard Kirby (arbitrator) (1904–2001), Australian industrial relations arbitrator
 Rick Kirby (born 1952), British sculptor

See also 
 Richard Kirby Ridgeway (1848–1924), Irish soldier